Park River  may refer to:

Towns
Park River, North Dakota

Rivers
Park River (North Dakota)
Park River (Connecticut)
Big Muddy Creek (Missouri River tributary), also known as Park River